81st NBR Awards
January 12, 2010

Best Film:
Up in the Air

The 81st National Board of Review Awards, honoring the best in film for 2009, are given on January 12, 2010.

Top Films
Up in the Air
(500) Days of Summer
An Education
The Hurt Locker
Inglourious Basterds
Invictus
The Messenger
A Serious Man
Star Trek
Up
Where the Wild Things Are

Top Foreign Films 
The Maid
Revanche
The Song of Sparrows
Three Monkeys
The White Ribbon

Top Documentaries 
Burma VJ: Reporting From A Closed Country
Crude
Food, Inc.
Good Hair
The Most Dangerous Man in America: Daniel Ellsberg and the Pentagon Papers

Top Independent Films 
Amreeka
District 9
Goodbye Solo
Humpday
In the Loop
Julia
Me and Orson Welles
Moon
Sugar
Two Lovers

Winners
Best Film:
Up in the Air
Best Foreign Language Film:
A Prophet, FranceBest Animated Feature:Up
Best Documentary Feature:
The Cove
Best Actor (tie):
Morgan Freeman - Invictus
George Clooney - Up in the Air
Best Actress:
Carey Mulligan - An Education
Best Supporting Actor:
Woody Harrelson - The Messenger
Best Supporting Actress:
Anna Kendrick - Up in the Air
Breakthrough Male Performances:
Jeremy Renner - The Hurt Locker
Breakthrough Female Performances:
Gabourey Sidibe - Precious
Best Ensemble Cast:
It's Complicated
Best Director:
Clint Eastwood - Invictus
Best Directorial Debut (tie):
Duncan Jones - Moon
Oren Moverman - The Messenger
Marc Webb - (500) Days of Summer
Best Screenplay - Adapted:
Up in the Air - Jason Reitman and Sheldon TurnerBest Screenplay - Original:A Serious Man - Joel and Ethan CoenFreedom of Expression Award (tie):Burma VJ: Reporting From A Closed Country
Invictus
The Most Dangerous Man in America: Daniel Ellsberg and the Pentagon Papers
Special Filmmaking Achievement Award:
Wes Anderson - Fantastic Mr. Fox
William K. Everson Award for Film History:
Jean Picker Firstenberg''

References

External links

2009
2009 film awards
2009 in American cinema